, is a Japanese composer, arranger, producer, keyboardist. He graduated from Tokyo University of the Arts. He was a producer of Wink, Noriyuki Makihara, Southern All Stars and many other artists. He also composes scores for video game series Metal Max.

References 

1959 births
Japanese composers
Japanese keyboardists
Japanese male composers
Japanese music arrangers
Japanese record producers
Living people
People from Kamakura
Tokyo University of the Arts alumni
Video game composers